Bogdan Marjanović (Serbian Cyrillic: Богдан Марјановић; born 3 November 1980) is a Serbian footballer.

Career
Marjanović previously played for FK Zvezdara and FK Jagodina in the Serbian SuperLiga, beside having represented some lower league clubs as FK Srem, FK Morava Ćuprija, FK Jedinstvo Donja Mutnica and FK Jedinstvo Paraćin. Before coming to FK Napredak Kruševac he played in Montenegrin First League club FK Mornar.

References

 Profile and 2009-10 stats at Montenegrin Federation site.

1980 births
Living people
People from Ćuprija
Serbian footballers
Serbian expatriate footballers
FK Zvezdara players
FK Srem players
FK Jagodina players
FK Napredak Kruševac players
Serbian SuperLiga players
Association football defenders